Sergei Arkadevich Vronsky (3 September 1923 in Rostov-on-Don – June 21, 2003) was a Soviet  cinematographer. Sergei Vronsky graduated from the Gerasimov Institute of Cinematography in 1953 and worked with Ivan Pyryev and Georgi Daneliya. He received USSR State Prize in 1981 for the film Autumn Marathon.

Filmography
The Blizzard (1964); directed by Vladimir Basov
Thirty Three (1965); directed by Georgi Daneliya
The Brothers Karamazov (1969); directed by Ivan Pyryev
Taming of the Fire (1972); directed by Daniil Khrabrovitsky
Queen of the Gypsies (1975); directed by Emil Loteanu
Afonya (1975); directed by Georgi Daneliya
Traktir na Pyatnitskoy (1978); directed by Aleksandr Faintsimmer
Autumn Marathon (1979); directed by Georgi Daneliya
White Snow of Russia (1980); directed by Yuri Vyshinsky
Aelita, Do Not Pester Men!  (1988); directed by Georgi Natanson

External links

 

1923 births
2003 deaths
Soviet cinematographers
Recipients of the USSR State Prize
Film people from Rostov-on-Don
Burials in Troyekurovskoye Cemetery